Tokhi (Pashto: توخی) is a Ghilji Pashtun tribe found throughout southern, eastern, southeastern and northeastern Afghanistan. Historically they have mostly lived in what is now Zabul Province, Helmand and Kandahar in Afghanistan.

Notables

Nazo Tokhi

See also
Hotaki
Hotaki dynasty
Khilji dynasty
Pashtun tribal structure
Pashtun tribes

References

Further reading
State and tribe in nineteenth-century Afghanistan

External links
www.tokhi.org

Ethnic groups in Afghanistan
Ghilji Pashtun tribes